Stanislaus "Tau" Kobierski (15 November 1910 in Düsseldorf — 18 November 1972) was a German footballer.

Kobierski's parents were Poles who emigrated to Germany from Poznań. Between 1931 and 1941, he played 26 times and scored 9 goals for the Germany national football team. He participated in the 1934 FIFA World Cup, and scored Germany's first ever World Cup goal, in the first round 5-2 win over Belgium. His home team was Fortuna Düsseldorf.

In autumn 1941 he was delegated to the sports club of the SS and German police in occupied Warsaw. At the end of the Second World War, he became a Soviet prisoner of war. He had to do forced labour in a mine in the Arctic Circle. He was released from captivity in 1949 and was able to return to West Germany.

References

External links
 
 
 

1910 births
1972 deaths
Footballers from Düsseldorf
German footballers
Germany international footballers
Fortuna Düsseldorf players
1934 FIFA World Cup players
German people of Polish descent
Association football forwards
German prisoners of war in World War II held by the Soviet Union